Birds described in 1889 include  blue-moustached bee-eater, Colima warbler, crowned hornbill, Esmeraldas woodstar, giant sunbird, fernwren, grey-crowned woodpecker, Hunter's sunbird, mountain greenbul, Reischek's parakeet, Woodford's rail.

Events
Death of Juan Lembeye and Eugen Ferdinand von Homeyer
Lamberto Loria begins collecting in New Guinea
Foundation of Royal Society for the Protection of Birds

Publications
Hans von Berlepsch  Zur Ornithologie der Provinz Santa Catharina, Süd-Brasilien; Journ. f. Ornith. 21, 1873, p. 225–293; l. c. Zur Ornithologie der Provinz Santa Catharina, Süd-Brasilien; Journ. f. Ornith. 22, 1874, p. 241–284.
Eugene W. Oates and William Thomas Blanford 1889–1898. The Fauna of British India, Including Ceylon and Burma. Vols. I-IV. Birds.
Joel Asaph Allen 1889. List of the birds collected in Bolivia by Dr. H. H. Rusby, with field notes by the collector. Bulletin of the American Museum of Natural History 2: 77-112 online AMNH
Alfred John North and George Barnard Descriptive Catalogue of the Nests and Eggs of Birds Found Breeding in Australia and Tasmania (1889) 
Ongoing events
Osbert Salvin and Frederick DuCane Godman 1879–1904. Biologia Centrali-Americana . Aves
Richard Bowdler Sharpe Catalogue of the Birds in the British Museum London,1874-98.
Anton Reichenow, Jean Cabanis,  and other members of the German Ornithologists' Society in Journal für Ornithologie online BHL
Ornis; internationale Zeitschrift für die gesammte Ornithologie.Vienna 1885-1905online BHL
The Auk online BHL
The Ibis

References

Bird
Birding and ornithology by year